Ralph Thomas Reed (July 6, 1890, Philadelphia – January 21, 1968, New York City) was the president of the American Express Company from 1944 to 1960. He joined the company in 1919 as assistant to the controller. He was the person who made the decision to create the American Express charge card, first issued in 1958.

References

1890 births
1968 deaths
American financial businesspeople
American Express people
Officers Crosses of the Order of Merit of the Federal Republic of Germany
Central High School (Philadelphia) alumni